François Gérin (3 August 1944 – 3 April 2005) was a member of the House of Commons of Canada. He was a lawyer by career.

Gérin was born in Coaticook, Quebec.

He represented the Quebec riding of Mégantic—Compton—Stanstead where he was first elected in the 1984 federal election under the Progressive Conservative party. He was re-elected in 1988, therefore becoming a member in the 33rd and 34th Canadian Parliaments.

However, he left the Progressive Conservative party on 5 May 1990 and became independent until he formally became a founding member of the Bloc Québécois in September 1991. In 1993, Gérin left federal politics and did not seek a third term in the House of Commons.

Electoral record

External links
 

1944 births
2005 deaths
Members of the House of Commons of Canada from Quebec
Bloc Québécois MPs
Independent MPs in the Canadian House of Commons
People from Estrie
Progressive Conservative Party of Canada MPs